Jean Bourgeois de Montibus was a Roman Catholic prelate who served as Auxiliary Bishop of Cologne (1506–?).

Biography
In 1506, Jean Bourgeois was appointed during the papacy of Pope Julius II as Auxiliary Bishop of Cologne and Titular Bishop of Cyrene. It is uncertain how long he served. While bishop, he was the principal co-consecrator of Érard de La Marck, Prince-bishop of the Prince-Bishopric of Liège (1506).

References

External links and additional sources
 (for Chronology of Bishops) 
 (for Chronology of Bishops)  
 (for Chronology of Bishops) 
 (for Chronology of Bishops)  

16th-century German Roman Catholic bishops
Bishops appointed by Pope Julius II